Sebastián Uriza Vega (1861 – after 1927) was a Nicaraguan politician and senator from Granada who was the President of Nicaragua from 30 October to 11 November 1926. Emiliano Chamorro appointed Uriza as his replacement, but Uriza's presidency was not recognized by any other continental governments.

Uriza was the president of the upper chamber of National Congress of Nicaragua in 1916, 1918–1922 and 1926–1927.

References

Presidents of Nicaragua
Presidents of the Senate (Nicaragua)
1861 births
Conservative Party (Nicaragua) politicians
Date of birth missing
Date of death missing
Year of death missing